Thalassiodracon (tha-LAS-ee-o-DRAY-kon) is an extinct genus of plesiosauroid from the Pliosauridae that was alive during the Late Triassic-Early Jurassic (Rhaetian-Hettangian) and is known exclusively from the Lower Lias of England. The type and only species, is Thalassiodracon (Plesiosaurus) hawkinsi (Owen, 1838).

Discovery and naming
Thalassiodracon hawkinsi is known from a number of complete skeletons (lectotype: BMNH 2018) acquired by the fossil collector Thomas Hawkins in Somerset, England during the early 1830s, before 1834. Hawkins, an eccentric Pre-Adamite who had his fossils heavily restaured and illustrated by distinguished artists in expensive editions to propagate his ideas, named these Plesiosaurus triotarsostinus in 1834 and Hezatarostinus in 1840 but these names are generally disregarded. Thalassiodracon lived in the Late Triassic (Rhaetian) to the Early Jurassic (Hettangian) of Europe (age range: 201.6 to 196.5 million years ago). It was named as Plesiosaurus Hawkinsii in 1838 by Richard Owen and it was made the type species of the genus Thalassiodracon in 1996 by Storrs & Taylor. 

A replica of the holotype specimen, replica catalogued as LDUCZ-X227, has been in the collection of the Grant Museum of Zoology and Comparative Anatomy in London, England since 1890 after being catalogued by Ray Lankester, and it is a cast of a specimen created in 1862 by Henry Augustus Ward. The original fossil, catalogued as BMNH 2018 and also bought by Hawkins in the 1830s, can be seen on display at the Natural History Museum, also in London, England.

The genus name Thalassiodracon means "sea dragon", while the specific name hawkinsi honours Hawkins.

Description

The neck of Thalassiodracon, however, was slightly shorter than that of subsequent Plesiosaurs. The cervical vertebrae were between 27 and 31, while those of Plesiosaurus were 35 - 37. Moreover, the skull was unusually short and equipped with long teeth. The orbits were very large, with sclerotic rings. Like all plesiosaurs, this animal had legs like paddles for swimming in the sea.

A computed tomography of an exceptionally preserved skull, and examination of other specimens (Benson et al., 2011) yields new anatomical data. Thalassiodracon had a dorsomedian ridge on the premaxilla, a squamosal bulb, four premaxillary teeth, and a heterodont maxillary dentition.

Classification
 
 
Thalassiodracon was originally placed in the genus Plesiosaurus. It has been classified in a new genus Thalassiodracon many years later following an examination of a skull. This animal is considered one of the oldest representatives of the group of plesiosaurs, perhaps ancestral to the superfamily of Pliosauroidea (short-necked plesiosaurs).

The following cladogram follows an analysis by Ketchum & Benson, 2011.

See also
 List of plesiosaur genera
 Timeline of plesiosaur research

References

Plesiosaurs of Europe
Triassic plesiosaurs
Early Jurassic plesiosaurs of Europe
Pliosaurids
Fossil taxa described in 1996
Sauropterygian genera